Fred Dean (14 April 1909 – 16 May 1989) was an  Australian rules footballer who played with North Melbourne in the Victorian Football League (VFL).

Notes

External links 

1909 births
1989 deaths
Australian rules footballers from Victoria (Australia)
North Melbourne Football Club players
West Melbourne Football Club players